Just One of Those Things may refer to:

 "Just One of Those Things" (song), a 1935 song written by Cole Porter
 Just One of Those Things (album), a 1957 album by Nat King Cole
 "Just One of Those Things" (Early Edition), an episode of Early Edition
 "Just One of Those Things", an episode of Working Girl

See also
 "One of Those Things"